Sven Maresch (born 19 January 1987) is a German judoka. He competed at the 2016 Summer Olympics in the men's 81 kg event, in which he was eliminated by Sergiu Toma in the second round.

References

External links
 
 

1987 births
Living people
German male judoka
Judoka at the 2016 Summer Olympics
Olympic judoka of Germany
European Games competitors for Germany
Judoka at the 2015 European Games
Sportspeople from Erfurt
20th-century German people
21st-century German people